The following is the list of well-known white nationalist organizations, groups and related media:

White nationalism is a political ideology which advocates a racial definition of national identity for white people; some white nationalists advocate a separate all-white nation state. White separatism and white supremacism are subgroups within white nationalism. The former seek a separate white nation state, while the latter add ideas from social Darwinism and National Socialism to their ideology. A few white nationalist organization leaders claim that they are mostly separatists, and only a smaller number are supremacists. Both schools of thought generally avoid the term supremacy, saying it has negative connotations.

Africa

South Africa
Afrikaner Weerstandsbeweging, (AWB) is a South African far-right secessionist political organisation. The AWB is committed to the creation of an independent Boer-Afrikaner republic or "" in South Africa.
Blanke Bevrydingsbeweging (English: White Liberation Movement) (BBB). The BBB, founded in 1985 and banned under the Apartheid regime in 1988, sought a white South Africa by the removal of the black population.
Herstigte Nasionale Party (English: Reconstituted National Party). A far-right party supporting Afrikaner nationalism and a return to apartheid.
South African Gentile National Socialist Movement, White South African Nazist movement which initially started out as a paramilitary. It was renamed the White Workers Party in 1949, but dissolved soon after as many of its members defected to the Herenigde Nasionale Party. The group is known for organizing the Gryshemde (Greyshirts), which was considered to be the nation's equivalent to the Sturmabteilung (Brownshirts) of Nazi Germany.

Europe

United Kingdom
Blood & Honour is a neo-Nazi music promotion network and political group founded in 1987 with links to Combat 18 and composed of white power skinheads and other white nationalists. The group organizes white power concerts by Rock Against Communism bands and distributes a magazine with the same name.
British National Party is a far-right political party formed as a splinter group from the British National Front by John Tyndall in 1982. The BNP restricted membership to people it referred to as "Indigenous Caucasian", effectively excluding non-whites, until 2009 when its constitution was challenged in the courts on grounds of racial discrimination.
National Front, a small far-right party which was more prominent in the 1970s.
Patriotic Alternative is a British far-right white nationalist political organisation formed in September 2019 by Mark Collett, a former member of the British National Party.

Russia
Wagner Group

Rusich Group

Russian Imperial Movement

Russian Imperial Union-Order

Slavic Union

National Socialism / White Power

Great Russia (political party)

Russian National Socialist Party

Russian National Union

Russian National Unity (2000)

Russian National Unity

Pamyat
Front of National Revolutionary Action

The Americas

North America

United States
 11th Hour Remnant Messenger was a group which was founded by two wealthy retired entrepreneurs who believed that whites were the true biblical Israelites.
American Renaissance, is a "race realist and white advocacy website", formerly a monthly magazine, published by the New Century Foundation.
 American Freedom Party, formerly known as the American Third Position Party, is an American political party which promotes white supremacy. It was founded in 2010, and it defines its principal mission as representing the political interests of white Americans.
 American Nazi Party is an antisemitic, neo-Nazi organization whose ideology is largely based upon the ideals and policies of Adolf Hitler's NSDAP which ruled Germany during the era of the Third Reich. It also advocates Holocaust denial.
 Aryan Brotherhood of Texas is, according to the Anti-Defamation League and the Southern Poverty Law Center,  one of the largest and most violent white supremacist prison gangs in the United States, responsible for murders and other violent crimes.
Aryan Republican Army (ARA) was a white nationalist terrorist organization which espoused Christian Identity.
 Aryan Nations, is a white supremacist neo-Nazi organization which was founded in the 1970s by Richard Girnt Butler as an arm of the Christian Identity group which is known as the Church of Jesus Christ-Christian. The Federal Bureau of Investigation has called Aryan Nations a "terrorist threat", and the RAND Corporation has called it the "first truly nationwide terrorist network" in the US. 
 Asatru Folk Assembly, part of the racist ("folkish") branch of the Heathenry movement. 
Atomwaffen Division, a Neo-Nazi and Satanist terrorist organisation.
 Council of Conservative Citizens, an American political organization which supports a large variety of conservative and paleoconservative causes in addition to white separatism.
 Creativity Alliance, (formerly known as the World Church of the Creator) is a white supremacist political organization that advocates the racialist religion, Creativity. Mainly religious rather than political, the radical Creativity Alliance or the Church of Creativity, founded by Ben Klassen in 1973, worships the white race rather than any deity, and it also advocates a radical form of white supremacism which is known as RAHOWA.
EURO, is a white separatist organization in the United States. Led by former Louisiana state representative, presidential primary candidate and Grand Wizard of the KKK David Duke, it was founded in 2000.
 Goyim Defense League and video channel GoyimTV, an antisemitism group run by Jon Minadeo II.
 Hammerskins, also known as the Hammerskin Nation, are a white supremacist group which was formed in 1988 in Dallas, Texas. Their primary focus is the production and promotion of white power rock music, and many white power bands have been affiliated with the group.
 Identity Evropa is an American neo-Nazi and white supremacist organization which was established in March 2016.
 Ku Klux Klan, often abbreviated KKK and informally known as The Klan, is the name of three distinct past and present  organizations in the United States, which have advocated extremist and reactionary currents such as white supremacy and nationalism.  The Klan is classified as a hate group by the Anti-Defamation League and the Southern Poverty Law Center. It is estimated to have between 5,000 and 8,000 members, split among dozens of different organizations that use the Klan name as of 2012.
National Alliance, was a white supremacist political organization. It was founded by William Luther Pierce, and it was based in Hillsboro, West Virginia.
National Association for the Advancement of White People, was a white supremacist organization in the United States which was incorporated on December 14, 1953, in Delaware by Bryant Bowles. It presents itself as a civil rights organization which models itself after the NAACP.
 National Policy Institute, is a think tank based in Augusta, Georgia, in the United States. It describes itself as the right's answer to the Southern Poverty Law Center.
 National Socialist Movement (United States), a party which was founded in 1974. Since 2005, the party has been very active, staging many marches and demonstrations.
 National Vanguard, was an American National Socialist organization based in Charlottesville, Virginia, founded by Kevin Alfred Strom and former members of the National Alliance.
Nationalist Movement, is a Mississippi-based, white supremacist organization which advocates what it calls a "pro-majority" position. It has been called a white supremacist organization by the Associated Press and the Anti-Defamation League, among other organizations.
Occidental Quarterly, is a printed far-right quarterly journal with a web segment, TOQ Online, including interviews, essays and reviews on the website.
The Order, or Brüder Schweigen ("Silent Brotherhood") was a white supremacist Revolutionary organization founded by Robert Jay Mathews, active 1983–1984, probably best known for the 1984 murder of talk show host Alan Berg. Berg's killing was to be the first in a planned series of assassinations, followed by attacks on the United States government, all meant to bring about a race war which would result in fulfillment of White Separatist ideals (see Northwest Territorial Imperative).
Pacifica Forum, is a controversial discussion group in Eugene, Oregon, United States. It has been listed as a white nationalist hate group by the Southern Poverty Law Center (SPLC).
Patriot Front is a neo-fascist and american nationalist group and it is an offshoot of Vanguard America
Phineas Priesthood, is a Christian Identity movement that opposes interracial intercourse, the mixing of races, homosexuality, and abortion. It is also marked by its anti-Semitism, anti-multiculturalism, and opposition to taxation.
Pioneer Fund, a white supremacist non-profit that funds scientific racism research.
The Social Contract Press, a publisher of white nationalist literature which was founded by John Tanton.
 Volksfront, describes itself as an international fraternal organization for persons of European descent. It has been called "neo-Nazi" and a "racist-skinhead group" in press reports. The Anti-Defamation League has called the group "one of the most active skinhead groups in the United States." The Southern Poverty Law Center (SPLC) has added Volksfront to its list of hate groups.
White America, Inc., a group which was founded in Arkansas in order to prevent the racial desegregation of the state's schools.
White Aryan Resistance, a neo-Nazi white supremacist organization which was founded and led by former Ku Klux Klan leader Tom Metzger.

Canada
Aryan Guard, was founded in late 2006 but did not gain any media attention until 2007 when members began a flier campaign targeting immigrants. Some of these flyers had been surreptitiously placed in the free Calgary arts and culture newspaper, "Fast Forward" by Aryan Guard members. The Friends of the Simon Wiesenthal Center for Holocaust Studies suspect that the individual responsible for the fliers may be Bill Noble, a neo-Nazi well known to law enforcement for his online racist activism and who has been in the past charged under Section 319 of the Canadian Criminal Code for wilful promotion of hatred. The Aryan Guard's website is also registered in Noble's name.
Canadian Heritage Alliance, is a Canadian white supremacist group founded in Kitchener-Waterloo, Ontario. Detective Terry Murphy of London's Hate Crime Unit alleged that the group had links with the Heritage Front and the Kitchener/Waterloo/Cambridge-based Tri-City Skins.
Heritage Front, was a Canadian neo-Nazi white supremacist organization founded in 1989 and disbanded around 2005.
Ku Klux Klan, started activity in parts of Canada in the 1920s and has lasted all the way until the modern day.
National Socialist Party of Canada, is a neo-Nazi party founded in 2006 by Terry Tremaine.  The party uses a flag featuring a red swastika on a field of blue.
Northern Order, a Neo-Nazi terrorist organisation.
Tri-City Skins, was an Ontario-based white power group active from 1997 to 2002 in the Kitchener-Waterloo and Cambridge area. James Scott Richardson was the group's most visible member, and in October 2001, police believed that Tri-City Skins had 25 members in southwestern Ontario.
Western Canada for Us, was a short-lived Alberta-based white nationalist group founded by Glenn Bahr and Peter Kouba in early 2004.
Western Guard Party, (founded in 1972 as the Western Guard) was a white supremacist group based in Toronto, Canada. It evolved out of the far-right anti-Communist Edmund Burke Society that had been founded in 1967 by Don Andrews, Paul Fromm, Leigh Smith and Al Overfield.
The Loyal White Knights of the Ku Klux Klan, is an alleged branch of the KKK operating in Chilliwack, BC. In July 2017, a group claiming to be from the organization flyers lawns across the city.

South America

Brazil
 Neuland (New Land) is a violent neo-Nazi group active in Brazil as of the latter part of the first decade of the 21st century.

Uruguay
 Orgullo Skinhead, the National Revolutionary Front of Uruguay, and Poder Blanco were three neo-Nazi organizations active in Uruguay in the late 1990s and early 2000s.

Oceania

Australia

Antipodean Resistance
Australians Against Further Immigration (1989–2008)
Australia First Party
Patriotic Youth League (defunct; reconstituted as Eureka Youth League) 
Australian Nationalist Movement (WA, 1980s)
Australian National Socialist Party (founded 1962, merged into National Socialist Party of Australia) 
Creativity Alliance 
Fraser Anning's Conservative National Party (2019–2020)
Southern Cross Hammerskins
National Action (Australia) (1980s)
National Socialist Network (2020s)
National Socialist Party of Australia (1968–1970s)
New Guard (1930s)
Reclaim Australia
 Right Wing Resistance Australia 
True Blue Crew
United Patriots Front (2015–2017?)

New Zealand
 National Socialist Party of New Zealand (historical)
New Zealand National Front (formed 1977)
Right Wing Resistance
Creativity Alliance

Media

White nationalist webforums 
The Daily Stormer, a Neo-Nazi, antisemitic online newspaper which is named after the Nazi tabloid Der Stürmer.
Podblanc, an antisemitic and white supremacist video sharing website.  Its founder, Craig Cobb, designed it as an alternative to YouTube, which Cobb calls "Jew Tube" due to its policy of banning racist and anti-Semitic content.
Stormfront is an antisemitic and white nationalist Internet forum.
Metapedia, a white nationalist online encyclopedia, similar to Wikipedia.
Redwatch, a British neo-Nazi and antisemitic website.
Vanguard News Network, an antisemitic and white supremacist website.
VDARE, an anti-immigration and white supremacist website.

White nationalist radio shows 
 The Derek Black Show was a white nationalist radio program which was broadcast five times a week from the Lake Worth, Florida-based radio station WPBR-AM. Derek Black is the son of Don Black, the founder of the large white nationalist discussion forum which is named Stormfront. Stormfront and Black are now located on the Jeff Rense radio network.
 Hal Turner ran the now defunct Hal Turner Radio Network'' and website.

See also 
Anti-fascism
Anti-Fascist Action
Antifa (United States)
Anti-racism
Anti-Racist Action
Anti-Romani sentiment
Antisemitism
Antisemitism in Europe
Antisemitism in the United States
Ethnic conflict
Ethnic nationalism
Ethnic violence
Ethnocentrism
Eugenics
Far-right politics
Far-right populism
Far-right subcultures
Fascism
Fascism in Africa
Fascism in Asia
Fascism in Europe
Fascism in Canada
Fascism in North America
Fascism in South America
Fundamentalism
Geography of antisemitism
History of antisemitism
History of antisemitism in the United States
Holocaust Denial
List of fascist movements
List of fascist movements by country
List of Ku Klux Klan organizations
List of nationalist organizations
List of neo-Nazi organizations
List of organizations designated by the Southern Poverty Law Center as hate groups#White nationalist
Nationalism
Nativism (politics) 
Nazism
Neo-Confederates
Neo-fascism
Neo-Nazism
Populism
Race (human categorization)
Racial nationalism
Racism
Racism against Black Americans
Racism by country
Racism in Canada
Racism in Europe
Racism in the United States
Radical right (Europe)
Radical right (United States)
Rashism
Religious nationalism
Religious terrorism
Right-wing politics
Right-wing populism
Right-wing terrorism
 Supremacism
White nationalism
White supremacy
Xenophobia

References

External links 
"The Effect of Legal Action"—Crossstar Community white nationalist website provides a list of the prison sentences for various offenses received by various United States white nationalists representing numerous different white nationalist organizations:

White nationalism

Far-right political parties